The Parti indépendantiste fielded thirty-nine candidates in the 1985 Quebec provincial election, none of whom were elected. Information about these candidates may be found on this page.

Candidates

Dorion: Normand Lacasse
Normand Lacasse received 268 votes (1.09%), finishing fifth against Liberal candidate Violette Trépanier.

References

Candidates in Quebec provincial elections